Skagsnebb is a mountain in Lom Municipality in Innlandet county, Norway. The mountain is surrounded by several other notable mountains including Galdhøpiggen and Sauhøi to the east, Storbreahøe to the south, Veslbreatinden and Storbreatinden to the southwest, Veslfjelltinden to the west, and Loftet to the northwest.

See also
List of mountains of Norway by height

References

Jotunheimen
Lom, Norway
Mountains of Innlandet